is a Japanese illustrator primarily of light novels, although he has worked on one video game.

Works
Novels
Hanamori
Ichigoiro Kinku
The Ideal Sponger Life
Imagine Hiseki
Spice and Wolf

Games
Angel Bullet
Last Bullet

External links
Jū Ayakura's personal website 

Japanese illustrators
Living people
1981 births
Artists from Kyoto Prefecture
Place of birth missing (living people)
Video game artists